Tazehabad (also Romanized as Tāzehābād; also known as Kanī Golzār, Kānī-ye Golzār, Tāzehābād-e Kānī Golzār, and Tāzehābād-e Qarā Gowl) is a village in Quri Chay Rural District, in the Central District of Dehgolan County, Kurdistan Province, Iran. At the 2006 census, its population was 214, in 46 families. The village is populated by Kurds.

References 

Towns and villages in Dehgolan County
Kurdish settlements in Kurdistan Province